Fountain Springs may refer to:

Fountain Springs, California, a settlement established in Tulare County
Fountain Springs, Pennsylvania, a census-designated place in Schuylkill County
Fountain Springs Park, a wilderness park in Delaware County, Iowa

See also
Fountain Spring, West Virginia, an unincorporated community located in Wood County